Schinia scarletina is a moth of the family Noctuidae. It is found in North America, including Arizona, Kansas, New Mexico, Utah, California, south to Baja California.

The wingspan is about 20 mm.

Larvae have been recorded on Stephanomeria.

External links
Images
Butterflies and Moths of North America

Schinia
Moths of North America
Moths described in 1900